Mircea Costache II (2 May 1940 – 16 February 2016) was a Romanian handball player and coach who played as a pivot for Dinamo București and for the national team. He scored the winning goal in the 1961 World Championship final.

After retiring he became a coach in his native Romania and abroad in Algeria and Portugal. Costache led the national team of Algeria to a World Cup for the first time in 1974.

Between 1988 and 1995 he was named coach of both the Portugal senior national team and the Portuguese youth sides, with whom he won the European Youth Handball Championship in 1992.

Costache was also an associate professor at the Moderna University in Lisbon from 1997 to 2002.

Honours

Player
Dinamo Bucharest
Romanian League: 1959, 1960, 1961, 1962, 1964, 1965, 1966
European Cup: 1965
Runner-up: 1963

National team
Romania
World Champion: 1961, 1964Bronze medal'': 1967

Coach
Nadit Alger
Algerian League: 1974, 1975
Algerian Cup: 1973

Águas Santas
Campeonato Nacional (III Divisão): 1996

Algeria
Winner of the gold medal at the 1973 African Games 
Winner of the gold medal at the 1975 African University Games 
Winner of the silver medal at the 1976 African Championship
Winner of the bronze medal at the 1975 Mediterranean Games

Portugal 
Winner of the gold medal at the 1992 European Youth Championship
Winner of the bronze medal at the 1995 IHF Junior World Championship

Distinctions
Ordinul Muncii: 1961
Maestru Emerit al Sportului: 1961
Medalia "Meritul Sportiv": 1964
Medalha de Bons Serviços Desportivos (Portugal): 1993
Medalia Serviciu Credincios: 2001
Ordinul "Meritul sportiv" clasa II-a: 2009
Campion de Legendă: 2009

References

Selected publications

External links 
Obituary of Mircea Costache II CSDinamo.eu 
Obituary of Mircea Costache II Portuguese Handball Federation 

1940 births
2016 deaths
Romanian male handball players
Romanian handball coaches
CS Dinamo București (men's handball) players
Sportspeople from Bucharest
Romanian expatriate sportspeople in Algeria
Romanian expatriate sportspeople in Portugal
Recipients of the National Order of Faithful Service